Momoland is a South Korean girl group that consists of Ahin, Hyebin, Jane, JooE, Nancy, Nayun and formerly Daisy, Taeha and Yeonwoo. The following is a complete list of the 36 officially released songs by Momoland.

Recorded songs

References

Momoland